Makonnen Kebret (1935–1990) was an Ethiopian diplomat.
Makonnen Kebret was a specialist in agricultural education.
From 1948 to 1968 he was professor and dean of the College of Agriculture, Addis Ababa University.
From 1968 to 1971 he was associate academic vice president of the Addis Ababa University.
From  to  he was first Ethiopian ambassador in Beijing.
From 1975 to 1990 he was employed at the Awash River Valleys Agricultural Development Authority (VADA) 1977 and the Ministry of Agriculture (Ethiopia). 
From 1986 to 1991 he was Executive Secretary of the Intergovernmental Authority on Development.

published 
The contribution of agricultural education to the rural development of Ethiopia. Cornell Univ., 1964

References

1935 births
1990 deaths
Ambassadors of Ethiopia to China
Cornell University alumni